The Dendrominiaceae are a family of fungi in the order Corticiales. 

The family contains the single genus Dendrominia comprising four species of effused, corticioid fungi:
 Dendrominia burdsallii
 Dendrominia dryina
 Dendrominia ericae
 Dendrominia maculata

References

Corticiales
Basidiomycota families